"Feel Good" is the debut single from London-based dubstep/electronic rock band Modestep, and the lead single from their debut album Evolution Theory. The single was released on 6 February 2011 in the United Kingdom as a digital download. The song entered the UK Singles Chart at number 38.

Music video
A music video to accompany the release of "Feel Good" was first released onto YouTube on 24 December 2010 at a total length of four minutes and twenty-five seconds.

Track listing

Release history

References

External links

2011 debut singles
Modestep songs
Polydor Records singles
2011 songs